Jinxed at First is a South Korean television series starring Seohyun, Na In-woo, Jun Kwang-ryul, and Yoon Ji-hye. Based on the Kakao webtoon written by Han Ji-hye, and illustrated by Goo Seul. It aired on KBS2 from June 15, to August 4, 2022, every Wednesday and Thursday at 21:50 (KST) for 16 episodes. It is also available for streaming on iQIYI in selected regions.

Synopsis
Jinxed at First tells the story of Gong Soo-kwang (Na In-woo), who is a bright young man who graduated from Korea University, but poor and famous for being unlucky, meets Lee Seul-bi (Seohyun), a girl who can see the future of everyone she touches. Seul-bi and her mother live in a secret room at the Sam Jung family's house.  One day, Seon Min-joon's (Sam Jung's son) friends visit his house.  That's when a miracle happened where the door that locked Seul-bi and her mother opened, the curious Seul-bi came out and met Soo-kwang.  Seul-bi followed Soo-kwang who came home from Sam Jung's house to Soo-kwang's house.  Since then Soo-kwang's life has changed drastically.

Cast

Main
 Seohyun as Lee Seul-bi
 Na In-woo as Gong Soo-kwang / Go Myung-sung
 Jun Kwang-ryul as Seon Sam-joong
 Yoon Ji-hye as Lee Mi-soo

People related to Keumhwa Group
 Ki Do-hoon as Seon Min-joon
 Cha Kwang-soo as Seon Il-joong
 Choi Jung-woo as Seon Dong-shik
 Jung Wook as Secretary Cha
 Jung In-gyeom as Seon Joo-cheol

Seodong Market
 Woo Hyun as President Park / Park Seong-deok
 Hong Seok-cheon as President Hong / Hong Seok-ki
 Hwang Young-hee as Mrs. Bang
 Lee Seon-jeong as Oh Eun-jeong 
 Kim Hyun-bin as Oh Eun-soo
 Hwang Seok-jeong as Yoon Yi-young, owner of Smile Fisheries
 Kim Dong-young as Chief Wang
 Park Sang-won as Pi Dae-shik
 Jang Yoon-seo as Jang Young-woo
 Kang Hak-soo as Mr. Jang
 Yoon Seo-jeong as Young Woo-une

Other
 Lee Ho-jung as Jo Jang-kyung
 Cho Han-gyeol as Jo Jang-geun
 Yoon Yoo-sun as Su Kwang-mo / Gong Soo-kwang's mother
 Yoo Ha-bok as Uncle's Go
 Kim Nan-hee as Ms.Min
 Lee Hoon as Secretary Jeong / Jeong Bi-seo / Jeong Hyeon-tae

Extended
 Kim Bo-yeon as Eun Ok-jin

Special appearance
 Kim Jung-tae as Kang Ho-jae, husband of the owner of Smile Fisheries
 Choi Yu-hwa

Production
The filming was reported to have started in August 2021 and expected to have concluded in December 2021.

Original soundtrack

Part 1

Part 2

Part 3

Part 4

Part 5

Viewership

Notes

References

External links
  
 
 
 

Korean Broadcasting System television dramas
Korean-language television shows
Television series by Victory Contents
South Korean fantasy television series
South Korean romance television series
Television shows based on South Korean webtoons
2022 South Korean television series debuts
2022 South Korean television series endings
South Korean pre-produced television series